Yaoundé Hospital may refer to:
Central Hospital of Yaoundé
Yaoundé General Hospital
Yaoundé Gynaecology, Obstetrics and Pediatrics Hospital
University Teaching Hospital of Yaounde